Lake Dey Dey is one of many ephemeral salt lakes located in the eastern end of the Great Victoria Desert, in the Far North region of South Australia.

Description
It is normally dry, except during and after periods of heavy rainfall. It is part of the geological basin known as the Officer Basin. The larger Carle Thulka is to the south. Since 1985, Lake Dey Dey is part of the lands belonging to the Maralinga Tjarutja, a southern branch of the Pitjantjatjara. The community of Oak Valley is located nearby to the southwest.

The surface of the lake normally consists of dry clay, silt or sand, covered with a salty crust. The area around Lake Dey Dey is extremely arid, and groundwater contains high levels of salinity.

The lake is culturally important to the Maralinga Tjarutja people. Both Dey Dey and Lake Maurice have  (Dreaming stories) associated with them, and access to some parts of Dey Dey is restricted to initiated individuals.

See also

 List of lakes of South Australia

References

Dey Dey
Far North (South Australia)
Great Victoria Desert